is a passenger railway station in located in the city of Kameyama, Mie Prefecture, Japan, operated by Central Japan Railway Company (JR Tōkai).

Lines
Shimonoshō Station is served by the Kisei Main Line, and is 5.5 rail kilometers from the terminus of the line at Kameyama Station.

Station layout
The station consists of two opposed side platforms connected by a footbridge. There is no station building, but only a small waiting room.

Platforms

Adjacent stations

|-
!colspan=5|Central Japan Railway Company (JR Central)

History
Shimonoshō Station opened on August 21, 1891, as a station on the Tsu spur line of the privately owned Kansai Railway. The line was nationalized on October 1, 1907, and it became the Sangu Line of the Japanese Government Railways (JGR) on October 12, 1909. The station was transferred to the control of the Japan National Railways (JNR) Kisei Main Line on July 15, 1959. The station has been unattended since December 21, 1983. The station was absorbed into the JR Central network upon the privatization of the JNR on April 1, 1987.

Passenger statistics
In fiscal 2019, the station was used by an average of 304 passengers daily (boarding passengers only).

Surrounding area
Tsu City Toyogaoka Elementary School
 Tsutoyogaoka Post Office

See also
 List of railway stations in Japan

References

External links

  JR Central timetable 

Railway stations in Japan opened in 1891
Railway stations in Mie Prefecture
Kameyama, Mie